Plasma alpha-L-fucosidase (see alpha-L-fucosidase) is an enzyme that in humans is encoded by the FUCA2 gene.

References

Further reading